Ivica Vukotić (born 6 January 1977) is a Serbian professional basketball coach and former player.

Professional career 
A point guard, Vukotić played for Zastava, Mogren Budva, Kumanovo, TuS Jena, Igokea, Jedinstvo Bijelo Polje, Dunav 2007 Ruse,AMAK SP Ohrid, Spars Sarajevo, Plana, and Stragari. He retired as a player with Stragari in 2014.

Coaching career 
In August 2018, Vukotić was named the head coach of Radnički 1950 Kragujevac. He left in August 2020.

On 23 January 2021, Radnički Kragujevac hired Vukotić as their new head coach. He resign in February 2022.

References

External links
 Ivica Vukotic (Player) at eurobasket.com
 Ivica Vukotic (Coach) at eurobasket.com
 Ivica Vukotic at proballers.com

1977 births
Living people
Basketball League of Serbia players
KK Igokea players
KK Plana players
KK Radnički Kragujevac (1950–2004) players
KK Radnički 1950 coaches
KK Zastava players
KKK Radnički coaches
OKK Spars players
Science City Jena players
Serbian expatriate basketball people in Bosnia and Herzegovina
Serbian expatriate basketball people in Bulgaria
Serbian expatriate basketball people in Germany
Serbian expatriate basketball people in Montenegro
Serbian expatriate basketball people in North Macedonia
Serbian expatriate basketball people in Romania
Serbian men's basketball coaches
Serbian men's basketball players
Sportspeople from Kragujevac
Point guards